John H. Pitchford (1857-1923) was an American jurist from Walhalla, South Carolina, descended from Irish immigrant ancestors. John was raised in Walhalla and completed his early education at Newberry College. He then studied law in a private law office, and was admitted to the bar on his 21st birthday (March 8, 1878). His first legal practice was in Clayton, Georgia, but he soon moved to the city of Gainesville, Georgia.

Moving west
Although his law practice in Georgia prospered, Pitchford decided to move west in 1890, settling for a few years in Fort Smith, Arkansas, and forming a partnership with Col. Ben T. DuVal. In 1896, he moved again, this time into Indian Territory, where he settled in Talequah and set up a new law practice. He became a popular figure in Talequah, where he was elected mayor in 1900, the first white man elected to that office.  At the end of one year, he stepped down to return to private practice. In 1907, after Oklahoma became a state, Pitchford was elected as the first judge of the First Judicial District of Oklahoma. He was re-elected in 1910 for a term ending in 1919, even as his district expanded to include Adair, Cherokee, Delaware and Sequoyah counties.

In state elections held in 1918, Pitchford ran for and won the Democratic Party nomination for Associate Justice of the Oklahoma Supreme Court in August, then beat his Republican Party opponent.

Thoburn gave Pitchford high marks for fairness, and impartiality in his courtroom.

Death and commemoration
Law Notes reported that John H. Pitchford died March 2, 1923, at his home in Oklahoma City.

On April 16, 1923, the Supreme Court called a special session to commemorate three people who had died in March or early April: John H. Pitchford, late Chief Justice, C. H. Elting, Associate Justice and Hon. E. G. McAdams, late Supreme Court Referee. Pitchford's replacement as Chief Justice, was Napoleon B. Johnson, who gave the closing address.

Organizations
Judge Pitchford belonged to the following organizations:
 Independent Order of Odd Fellows (IOOF)
 Royal Arch Chapter of Masonry
 Methodist Church
 Democratic Party

Personal
Pritchard first married Lola Bauknight, with whom he had two children, Joseph Irvin Pitchford and Henry DuVal Pitchfork. Joseph later became a lawyer in Sallisaw, Oklahoma, while Henry became a lawyer at Stilwell, Oklahoma. After Lola's death, Pritchard married Miss Viola Boggess.

Notes

References

Justices of the Oklahoma Supreme Court
1857 births
1923 deaths
American people of Irish descent
People from Gainesville, Georgia
People from Fort Smith, Arkansas
People from Oconee County, South Carolina
U.S. state supreme court judges admitted to the practice of law by reading law
People from Oklahoma City
Deaths from cancer in Oklahoma
Mayors of places in Oklahoma
Newberry College alumni
County judges in Oklahoma